Buxi Subdistrict is an urban subdistrict in Lengshuijiang, Loudi City, Hunan Province, People's Republic of China.

Administrative division
The subdistrict is divided into 5 communities and 4 villages, the following areas: 
 Buxi Community
 Qingyuan Community
 Shicha Community
 Zi River Community
 Guojia Community
 Yifang Village
 Zhayang Village
 Laowu Village
 Jiujing Village

References

Divisions of Lengshuijiang